The 2008 Munster Senior Hurling Championship was an annual hurling competition played between 1 June and 13 July 2008 between five hurling counties from the province of Munster. The Munster final was played on 13 July 2008 in the Gaelic Grounds, Limerick, between Tipperary and Clare. 
Tipperary claimed their first Munster Senior Hurling title since 2001 and 37th title overall as they overcame Clare by a score of 2-21 to 0-19.

Teams
Clare GAA
Cork
Limerick
Tipperary
Waterford

Results

See also
 All-Ireland Senior Hurling Championship 2008

External links
All-Ireland Hurling Championship Results
Official GAA Website
RTÉ Sport Website

Munster Senior Hurling Championship
Munster Senior Hurling Championship